Moldova competed at the 2018 Winter Olympics in Pyeongchang, South Korea, from 9 to 25 February 2018, with two competitors in two sports.

Competitors
The following is the list of number of competitors participating in the Moldovan delegation per sport.

Alpine skiing 

Moldova qualified one male athlete. Hoerl is an Austrian born skier who was recruited by The Moldovan ski federation in 2015. Hoerl decided to switch competing to Moldova, because he felt there was not a lot of chances on the deep Austrian team. Due to the nationality switch, Hoerl had to wait till the middle of 2017 to compete in FIS events for Moldova.

Cross-country skiing 

Moldova qualified one male athlete.

Distance

See also
Moldova at the 2018 Summer Youth Olympics

References

Nations at the 2018 Winter Olympics
2018
2018 in Moldovan sport